Beccariophoenix is a genus of three species of Arecaceae (palms), native to Madagascar. The genus is closely related to the Cocos, or coconut genus, and notably Beccariophoenix alfredii is similar in appearance to the coconut palm. It was named after Odoardo Beccari (1843-1920).

Description
Palms in this group have solitary trunks. Crownshafts are not present in the genus; the leaves are pinnate, to 2–5 m long. The term "windowpane" palm comes from the leaflets on younger plants that are only partially divided from each other, where there appear to be 'windows' in the leaves between the leaflets. Older specimens do not display the windowpanes as the leaflets completely divide from each other.

They are somewhat cold hardy, down to about -3 °C, making them a good look-alike for the coconut in cooler climates.

Species

The 'windows' palm was originally classified as a variant of B. madagascariensis, but was given its own name in June 2014.

References

Cocoseae
Arecaceae genera
Endemic flora of Madagascar
Trees of Madagascar
Taxonomy articles created by Polbot
Taxa named by Henri Lucien Jumelle
Taxa named by Joseph Marie Henry Alfred Perrier de la Bâthie